The men's football tournament at the 2019 Pacific Games was held from 8 to 20 July 2019. It was the 15th edition of the men's Pacific Games football tournament. Together with the women's competition, all matches were played at the J.S. Blatter Stadium in Apia, Samoa.

Unlike the men's football competition at the 2015 Pacific Games where only under-23 athletes were eligible to compete, this tournament was not age-restricted and thus was open to senior men's national teams. However, New Zealand was the only team to field an under-23 side.

Teams

Venues

Squads

Draw

The draw for the competition took place on 5 June 2019. It was streamed live on Facebook.

Officials
These are the referees that were appointed for the games, six of which are from AFF.

Referees
 Salesh Chand
 Thoriq Alkatiri
 Nazmi Nasaruddin
 Thein Thein Aye
 Nadia Browning
 Nick Waldron
 Clifford Daypuyat
 David Yareboinen
 Stephanie Minan
 George Time
 Natalia Lumukana
 Pari Oito
 Rani Perry
 Tapaita Lelenga
 Mongkolchai Pechsri
 Pansa Chaisanit
 Joel Hopken

Assistant Referees
 Avinesh Narayan
 Bertrand Brial
 Noah Kusunan
 Gerard Ionatana
 Malaetala Salanoa
 Maria Salamasina
 Natalia Lumukana
 Bernard Mutukera
 Douglas Mete
 Jeffrey Solodia
 Johnny Niabo
 Stephen Seniga
 Folio Moeaki
 Lata Kumatale
 Sione Teu
 Tevita Makasini
 Hilton Sese
 Jeremy Garae

Group stage

Group A

Group B

Final stage

Bronze final

Gold final

Goalscorers

See also
Football at the 2019 Pacific Games – Women's tournament
Football at the 2019 Pacific Games
Football at the Pacific Games

References

External links
Official 2019 Pacific Games website
XV Pacific Games Men's Tournament, Official OFC website

Mens